Big Island may refer to:

Canada
 Big Island (Newfoundland and Labrador)
 Big Island, Nova Scotia, a peninsula in Pictou County

Nunavut
 Big Island (Hudson Bay, Nunavut), near Puvirnituq, Quebec
 Big Island (James Bay, Nunavut), near Chisasibi, Quebec
 Qikiqtarjuaq (Hudson Strait), formerly Big Island near Kimmirut

Ontario
 Big Island (Bay of Quinte)
 Big Island (Lake Chemong), in Chemong Lake
 Big Island (Lake of the Woods), in Lake of the Woods
 Big Island (Pigeon Lake), in Pigeon Lake

Malaysia
 Big Island, Johor
 Big Island, Malaysia, in Malacca

United Kingdom
 Big Island (Northern Ireland)

United States

New Hampshire
 Big Island (Pawtuckaway Lake), in Pawtuckaway Lake
 Big Island (Umbagog Lake), in Umbagog Lake

New York
 Big Island (Chemung River), in Chemung County
 Big Island (Woodhull Lake), in Herkimer County

Other United States
 Big Island (Hawaii)
 Big Island Amusement Park, on Lake Minnetonka's Big Island, Minnesota
 Big Island, Ohio, an unincorporated community
 Big Island, Virginia, a census-designated place
 Big Island (Wood County, Wisconsin), in the Wisconsin River

Other uses
 Naoto Ohshima (born 1964), Japanese artist and video game designer